BBGI Global Infrastructure S.A. is a publicly listed investment company dedicated to infrastructure investments. Established in 2011 as Bilfinger Berger Global Infrastructure, the company adopted its present name in March 2014. It is a constituent of the FTSE 250 Index.

References

External links
  Official site

Financial services companies of the United Kingdom
Companies listed on the London Stock Exchange
2011 establishments in the United Kingdom
Companies established in 2011
Companies based in Luxembourg City